The Pulgasari, also known as Bulgasari, is a metal-eating legendary creature that appears in Korean mythology and folklore. The creature is a mixture of different animals, which are; a bear, an elephant, a rhino, a tiger and a bull, each representing specific body parts.

Mythology
The Pulgasari is a bloodthirsty beast that grows in size the more metal it eats. According to mythology, it was created by a Buddhist monk who was on the run from the law because Buddhism was illegal in Goryeo-era Korea. He created a small figure out of rice grains and fed it needles, and it began to grow. Soon enough it was massive, and the government send soldiers to kill it with arrows and swords, but it simply ate the metal weapons and grew in power. Finally they decided to kill it with fire, but this had no effect on it, and the Pulgasari carried the fire to burn down a local village. Myths differ on the fate of the Pulgasari; some say that it still lives to this day, while others say that it was defeated by monks.

See also
Pulgasari - A North Korean film about the monster
Bulgasari - A South Korean film about the monster

References

Korean folklore
Korean mythology
Mythological hybrids